In Article 18 of the Law on the National Arms, Flag, and Anthem (Ley Sobre El Escudo, la Bandera y el Himno Nacionales) there is a listing of dates that the Mexican flag is flown by all branches of government. Civilians are also encouraged to display the national flag on these days. Many of the dates listed in the law denote significant events and people that shaped of Mexican identity and the course of its History. Some of the holidays and commemorations listed require the flag to be flown at half-staff. The national flag can be flown any day of the year by civilians or at festive occasions in persurrence to Article 15 of the Law on the National Arms, Flag, and Anthem.

Full staff 
The Mexican flag will be flown at full staff on the following days:

Half staff 
On these following days, the national flag is flown at half staff, mostly commemorating the deaths of important heroes. At any time, the President of Mexico can issue a decree to have the flag flown at half-staff to honor the death of a person who was a major figure of the Mexican government, Mexican society, the head of state of another nation or a tragic event on a major scale. One example  is that on the 19th anniversary of the Mexico City earthquake in 1985, President Vicente Fox lowered the flags to half staff to honor the estimated 6,000 people who were killed.

Former flag days 
There also have been occasions where official flag day notices that been announced in the Official Journal of the Federation, but later revoked. One such case was that 1 November was declared a holiday to hoist the national flag in 1991, but was later removed from the list four years later from another order published in Official Journal of the Federation.

Notes
Change of Article 18 to add 21 April as a flag day; January 3, 2005. Retrieved 10 January 2006. 
The precise date varies every year.
The Arizona Daily Star (2005). Around the world; September 20, 2004. Retrieved 9 January 2006.
Addition of 2 May as a day to fly the Mexican flag at half-staff. Retrieved 11 January 2006.
Holiday created on 9 January 1991 in an order published in the Diario Official de la Federación; revoked in an order published 9 May 1995 in Diario Official de la Federación.

References

External links
English Text of the Law of the National Arms, Flag and Anthem - From Flags of the World.
Ley sobre el escudo, la bandera y el himno nacionales - Law of the National Arms, Flag and Anthem. In Spanish.

Flags of Mexico
Mexico